Clay Center is a city in and the county seat of Clay County, Kansas, United States.  As of the 2020 census, the population of the city was 4,199.

History
Clay Center was first settled in 1862. It was named from its position near the geographical center of Clay County.

The first post office was established in Clay Center on July 3, 1862.

Clay Center was located on the Chicago, Rock Island and Pacific and Union Pacific Railroads.

Geography
Clay Center is located at  (39.379920, -97.123168). Clay Center is unique, because it is the geographic midpoint between Los Angeles, California and New York City, the two largest American cities. Both cities are exactly  from Clay Center.

Climate
The climate in this area is characterized by hot, humid summers and generally mild to cool winters.  According to the Köppen Climate Classification system, Clay Center has a humid subtropical climate, abbreviated "Cfa" on climate maps.

Demographics

2010 census
As of the census of 2010, there were 4,334 people, 1,920 households, and 1,172 families living in the city. The racial makeup of the city was 96.9% White, 0.5% African American, 0.6% Native American, 0.3% Asian, 0.4% from other races, and 1.3% from two or more races. Hispanic or Latino people of any race were 1.8% of the population.

There were 1,920 households, of which 27.0% had children under the age of 18 living with them, 48.8% were married couples living together, 8.2% had a female householder with no husband present, 4.0% had a male householder with no wife present, and 39.0% were non-families. 35.0% of all households were made up of individuals, and 20.1% had someone living alone who was 65 years of age or older. The average household size was 2.21 and the average family size was 2.82.

The median age in the city was 44.5 years. 22.5% of residents were under the age of 18; 6.6% were between the ages of 18 and 24; 21.4% were from 25 to 44; 25.8% were from 45 to 64; and 23.7% were 65 years of age or older. The gender makeup of the city was 48.6% male and 51.4% female.

2000 census
As of the census of 2000, there were 4,564 people, 1,979 households, and 1,258 families living in the city. The racial makeup of the city was 97.98% White, 0.64% African American, 0.33% Native American, 0.20% Asian, 0.07% from other races, and 0.79% from two or more races. Hispanic or Latino people of any race were 0.53% of the population.

There were 1,979 households, out of which 27.0% had children under the age of 18 living with them, 52.6% were married couples living together, 7.2% had a female householder with no husband present, and 36.4% were non-families. 33.4% of all households were made up of individuals, and 19.7% had someone living alone who was 65 years of age or older. The average household size was 2.24 and the average family size was 2.83.

In the city, the population was spread out, with 23.0% under the age of 18, 7.3% from 18 to 24, 22.0% from 25 to 44, 22.5% from 45 to 64, and 25.1% who were 65 years of age or older. The median age was 43 years. For every 100 females, there were 94.0 males. For every 100 females age 18 and over, there were 88.7 males.

The median income for a household in the city was $31,531, and the median income for a family was $45,567. Males had a median income of $29,526 versus $16,149 for females. The per capita income for the city was $19,128. About 5.9% of families and 9.8% of the population were below the poverty line, including 12.5% of those under age 18 and 10.0% of those age 65 or over.

Arts and culture  
Clay Center is known for its public art scene dubbed "A Mural Movement." This consists of over 20 hand painted murals from artists all over the country. A Mural Movement was established in 2020 and garnered much local support. Its mission is to beautify the downtown district through the addition of original mural works that reinforce and celebrate local heritage. In promoting the community in this way, the Mural Movement provides a powerful first impression to travelers, and promotes the area to visitors. Travel Awaits named Clay Center one of "9 Midwestern Towns with Beautiful Building Murals".

Area events
Held each year on the last Saturday of September, the Piotique Festival is a portmanteau of Pioneer and Antique. Each year, hundreds of people come to Clay Center. Participants enjoy food vendors, craft booths, activities, live entertainment, and dancing on the Clay County Courthouse lawn. The festival kicks off downtown at 7:30 AM with the Piotique Road race.

Government
The Clay Center government consists of a mayor and eight council members, which meets twice a month.

Education

The community is served by Clay County USD 379 public school district, and Clay Center Community High School.

The Clay Center Carnegie Library is the public library for this community.

Notable people

 Herb Bradley, professional baseball player
 Tracy Claeys, Washington State football defensive coordinator and former University of Minnesota football head coach
 Warren Henry Cole, surgeon who pioneered X-ray use in medicine
 George Docking, former governor of Kansas
 Steve Doocy, host for Fox News, Fox & Friends TV talk show; author
 Tenney Frank, noted scholar and historian
 Lady Greyhound (dog), marketing mascot for Greyhound Lines in the late 1950s
 Nicole Ohlde, basketball player and WNBA player
 Otto D. Unruh, two-time Bethel College football coach and 21-year coaching career at Clay Center Kansas High School
 William D. Vincent, United States Representative

References

Further reading

External links

 Clay Center - official
 Clay Center - Directory of Public Officials
 Clay Center Chamber
 Clay Center city map, KDOT

Cities in Kansas
Cities in Clay County, Kansas
County seats in Kansas
1862 establishments in Kansas
Populated places established in 1862